Colegio de las Hijas de Jesus is a school run by the Daughters of Jesus located at Ledesma St., Iloilo City. It was first founded by Saint Candida Maria de Jesus

History 
In 1932, four nuns of the Congregacion de las Hijas de Jesus from Spain arrived in the Philippines. They were Sister Porta, Sister Maria Rey, Sr. Brigida Sagardoy and Sr. Teresa Garcia. They wanted every child to learn Christian values and principles so they established its mother house in Pototan, Iloilo where it founded its first school, Colegio de la Immaculada Concepcion.

In 1936, they established a school in Iloilo City named Colegio de Santo Angel temporarily administered by these four nuns while waiting for six other nuns from Spain. Shortly these six nuns arrived and took over the school administration. They were Sisters Saturnina Herrero, Patria Ortega, Eloisa Alonso, Angeles de Dios, Victoria Ruiz and Concepcion Tolosa. The school opened on June 7 the same year, with only three classes—kindergarten, Grades I and II and was supported by Tanza parish priest, Mill Hill Missionary Fr. Lawrence Rogan and Bishop James McCloskey of Jaro.

During the war, the school was closed. It reopened after the war with the addition of a high school department. Its name was changed to Colegio de las Hijas de Jesus.

Address	
Ledesma Street
5000 Iloilo City, Philippines

Schools in Iloilo City